The Premios 40 Principales for Best Argentine Act is an honor that was initially presented as part of Los Premios 40 Principales, the awards organized by Spanish music radio Los 40 Principales. Along with the rest of national American categories, it was discontinued after the 2011 edition due to the creation of Los Premios 40 Principales América, reemerging as part of them in 2014.

References

2011 music awards